Ebele Ezeamakam, known as Ebele the flutist, the first Nigerian professional female flutist.

Career 
Ezeamakam's passion for the flute started at 14 years old. She has released an official single co-written by Cobhams Asuquo titled, "Dreams Come True".

Discography

Selected singles 

"Jawa Chineke" (2009)
"If You Don't Know" (2011)
"Oghama"(2014)
"Dream Come True" (2015)

Awards and nominations

References

External links 
 

Living people
Musicians from Anambra State
21st-century Nigerian singers
Nigerian soul singers
Nigerian songwriters
Year of birth missing (living people)